Badfoot Brown & the Bunions Bradford Funeral & Marching Band (1971) is an album by Bill Cosby. It is an instrumental jazz-funk album in which Cosby plays electric piano. It is his third musical album release. The first track is a tribute to Martin Luther King Jr. It was issued on compact disc in 2008 by Dusty Groove.

Another jazz-funk album, titled Bill Cosby Presents Badfoot Brown & the Bunions Bradford Funeral Marching Band (no "&" between Funeral and Marching), was released the following year. Cosby did not perform on that album, but he wrote the music and produced it.

Track listing

References

1971 albums
Bill Cosby albums
Jazz-funk albums
Instrumental albums